Claude Charles Antoine Berny d'Ouvillé or Charles Berny (born in 1775 in Clermont and died in 1842 in Batignolles), was a French painter and miniaturist. He made exhibitions of his paintings in the Salon de Paris from 1802 to 1833, one of this portraits the one of the famous actress Émilie Leverd. His Étude de jeune fille dans un drapé classique is in the Wallace Collection.

He married Eulalie Joséphine Biju-Duval d'Algreis in 1811, and they had a child, who was portrayed by Eugène Delacroix in 1828 (the portrait is in McIlhenney Collection in Philadelphia, U.S.).

1775 births
1842 deaths
18th-century French painters
French male painters
19th-century French painters
19th-century French male artists
18th-century French male artists